The Ministry of Housing is a ministry in the Government of Maharashtra. Ministry is responsible for implementation of laws and acts related to housing in Maharashtra.

The Ministry is headed by a cabinet level minister. Devendra Fadnavis is current Deputy Chief Minister of Maharashtra and Minister of Housing.

Head office

List of Cabinet Ministers

List of Ministers of State

List of Principal Secretary
Valsa Nair Singh (IAS 1991), previously Principal Secretary Tourism, Civil Aviation and State Excise, was appointed Additional Chief Secretary of the Housing Department on 30th September 2022.

Maharashtra Housing & Area Development Authority (MHADA)

MHADA is a statutory housing authority and a nodal agency under Ministry of Housing, Government of Maharashtra.

The Maharashtra Housing & Area Development Authority (MHADA) was established by the Maharashtra Housing and Area Development Act, 1976. It came into existence on 5 December 1977. The erstwhile Mumbai Housing and Area Development Board was restructured by a Government Resolution dated 5.11.1992 and split into three separate Boards viz. Mumbai Housing and Area Development Board, Mumbai Building Repairs and Reconstruction Board and Mumbai Slum Improvement Board Under the Government Resolution No. 2679/B, dated 22.7.1992. At present MHADA is coordinating and controlling the activities of seven regional housing boards, setup for each revenue division in the state viz. Mumbai, Konkan, Pune, Nashik, Nagpur, Amravati, Aurangabad and two special purpose boards viz. Mumbai Building Repairs and Reconstruction Board and Mumbai Slum Improvement Board. In Mumbai, it has constructed about 3 lakh housing units.

Slum Rehabilitation Authority (SRA)
Slum Rehabilitation Authority (SRA) was established by the Maharashtra Government in 1995. SRA acts under Maharashtra Slum Areas (Improvement, Clearance and Redevelopment) Act, 1971. Authority mainly looks after rehabilitation of slum dwellers in the Mumbai region.

Maharashtra Housing Development Corporation(MHDC/MahaHousing)
Maharashtra Housing Development Corporation (MahaHousing) was registered in 2019 under Indian Companies Act 2013. Maharashtra Government runs affordable housing schemes under MahaHousing with the help of Government of India. It is part of the Pradhan Mantri Awas Yojana under which government provides an interest subsidy.

References

External links

Government ministries of Maharashtra
Housing organisations based in India
Maharashtra